Johny Antony is a popular Indian film director and actor, known for making comedy films in Malayalam cinema. He is from Changanassery in Kottayam district, Kerala. He worked for about a decade as an associate to directors Thulasidas, Taha, Kamal and Jose Thomas. Antony made his directorial debut with the slapstick comedy C.I.D. Moosa in 2003. His other directorial ventures include Kochi Rajavu (2005), Thuruppu Gulan (2006), Cycle (2008), Ee Pattanathil Bhootham (2009), Masters (2012), Thappana (2012) and Thoppil Joppan (2016). Antony made his acting debut with a role in the film Shikkari Shambhu (2018). His acting credits include the films Drama (2018), Joseph (2018), Ganagandharvan (2019), Varane Avashyamund (2020), and Home (2021).

Career
He began his film career as an assistant director and assisted around ten leading directors in Malayalam film. Antony became an independent director in C.I.D. Moosa and became a blockbuster comedy movie. 
Inspector Garud, with Dileep and Kavya Madhavan in lead roles, followed next.

In 2012, he directed two films, one being Masters, a movie starring Prithviraj, Sasikumar, Pia Bajpai, and Ananya, and the other being Thappana, a movie starring Mammootty, Murali Gopy, Charmy Kaur.

Filmography

As Director

As Assistant director

As Actor

References

External links 
 
 

Living people
Malayalam film directors
People from Changanassery
Film directors from Kerala
20th-century Indian film directors
Year of birth missing (living people)